Ali Al Sayed is a comedian based in Dubai. Al Sayed was named "one of the most influential comedians in the world" by Toastmasters International Magazine and was recently dubbed the “King of Laughter” by a group of university students competing for an internship with Rolling Stone ME. Al Sayed is the founder of the local entertainment company Viva Arts and is the co-director of Dubomedy Arts, the first and only Comedy and Urban Arts School in the MENA region.

Throughout his career, Al Sayed has performed alongside great comics including Dean Edwards of SNL, Dean Obeidallah, Maz Jobrani, Aron Kader, Remy Munasifi 'Saudi in Audis' creator, Sugar Sammy, Tommy Davidson of 'In Living Color', Hollywood legend Michael Winslow of 'Police Academy' movies, Stand Up Comedy Qatar's Halal Bilal and many more.

Performances and productions
Al Sayed performed in, as well as co-produced the first weekly Comedy and Variety Night in the UAE entitled 'Monday Night Funnies', got the crowd going at the 2010 EFFIE MENA Awards and Ahlan's 'Best in Dubai' Awards, performed in all three evenings of "The Hilarious Show" which featured top international comedians, headlined the 'Academy of Joy Tour', 'Stand Up Expat' Comedy Tour  and 'Boys Night Out'  as part of the UAE Comedy Rotana Tour which packed them in for 12 shows over a 2-month period He also performed in New York as a featured comedian for the Comeback Dinner and Ceremony of the Hickok Belt Award.

Al Sayed also successfully produced the DUBOMEDY International Performing Arts Festival (DIPAF) 2010 and 2011 to unite and celebrate the diversity of the arts with the many cultural communities of the region that proved to be promising and inspiring to many performers and audiences. Al Sayed also produced 'Funny Girls' the first all female stand up comedy troupe and tour in the MENA Region. Al Sayed was invited as a part of the Dubomedy team to host Comedy workshops at the '3rd Annual Amman Stand-Up Comedy Festival', received rave reviews for his performance in Improv Revolution and recently co-produced the very first Comedy Festival in Abu Dhabi where he also performed to full houses.

Al Sayed also recently performed to full houses in Lebanon and in Qatar, where he was hosted by Stand Up Comedy Qatar.

He also appeared in the Edinburgh show Big In Dubai! at the Edinburgh Festival Fringe – the first UAE-produced comedy show to be a part of the festival. Al Sayed was also chosen to be an instructor at the 'Theater of Changes' festival in Greece, performed at the New York Arab-American Comedy Festival and the Muslim Funny Fest in New York City.

Coaching
Al Sayed has reached the stars by acting as a Diction Coach for the Hollywood actor 'Navid Negahban'. Al Sayed also achieved acclaim and recognition for his Acting Coaching skills and persona on the sets of the First Emirati-Indian film, the first prize award winning movie at the Dubai International Film Festival (Muhr Awards) – 'Mallal'; by the award winning director Nayla Al Khaja. Al Sayed was also selected along with his partner and now wife Mina Liccione, for Ahlan's Hot 100 as Dubai's Comedy Couple. Ali is currently working on TV and film projects and can be found performing in numerous live shows. Al Sayed also serves as a comedy coach for Dubomedy.

Media and TV
Ali has been a prominent figure in news and media, with news speeding all the way to the other side of the world, leaving his mark on The New York Times, as well as his own specials on Abu Dhabi TV and City 7. Ali has also been seen on MBC's Morning Show- 'Sabah Al Khair Ya Arab', 'Zahrat Al Khaleej', Dubai One TV's 'Twenty Something', Studio One and 'Out and About', as well as segments on Al Hurra, Al Rai and OSN. He is currently the weekly comedy commentator on Abu Dhabi Sports TV's show "The Beautiful Game" where he both writes and performs comedy material. Ali can also be seen on 'Stand-up Sketch Show' streaming on Shahid  as well as Comedy Central Arabia.

References

External links
 Official Website

Living people
Year of birth missing (living people)
Place of birth missing (living people)